Estamos locos... ¿o qué? is the third studio album by Spanish rock band Hombres G, released in 1987. The title, when translated into English, means "Are we crazy, or what?"

History
After finishing filming their first movie, Sufre mamón, Hombres G began work on their third studio album. David Summers isolated himself for a week at a family house in Huelva and upon returning to the rest of the band, had composed 12 songs.  To avoid pressure, Hombres G left for Manchester, where they recorded Estamos locos... ¿o qué? with producer Carlos Narea.

Track listing

Personnel 

 David Summers – vocals, bass
 Rafa Gutiérrez – guitar
 Daniel Mezquita – guitar
 Javier Molina – drums

References

External links
 Official site
 Discography

1987 albums
Hombres G albums